Pradip Basu (born 1957, Kolkata, India) is an Indian scholar of political science. He is currently a professor of political science at the Presidency University, Kolkata.

Career
He was a Research Scholar at the Centre for Studies in Social Sciences, Calcutta (CSSSC) from 1984–1985, and then a Doctoral Teacher Fellow of the Indian Council of Social Science Research (ICSSR) from 1988–1991. He earned his Ph.D. under the supervision of Partha Chatterjee on inner-party ideological struggles leading to Naxalism. He taught at the University of Kalyani, before moving on to teach at the Scottish Church College, later as a Guest Faculty in Political Science at the University of Calcutta. From 2010–2012, he was a Guest Faculty in Philosophy at the University of Calcutta. He is the founder and former chief editor of the Journal of Humanities and Social Sciences, which is an annually published refereed journal published by the Scottish Church College. Its Advisory Board includes Amartya Sen, Gayatri Chakravorty Spivak, Partha Chatterjee, Dipesh Chakraborty, Amiya Kumar Bagchi, Ashis Nandy, Sobhanlal Datta Gupta, Sukumari Bhattacharji and others. He was the founder-convener of Samaj-o-chinta, an academic seminar society in Kolkata which conducted monthly seminars in Bengali, from 1991 to 2006.

Areas of specialization
He specializes in postmodernism and the Naxalite movement, and was actively involved in Naxalite politics during 1974–1981, but gradually became critical of Naxalism and orthodox Marxism, and became interested in western Marxism, and the works of Antonio Gramsci, Louis Althusser, and the Frankfurt School. Over time he further moved towards poststructuralism, especially the works of Michel Foucault and Jacques Derrida. His chief academic interest lies in working for a possible dialogue between Naxalism and postmodernism, poststructuralism, postcolonialism and feminism.

Books

Authored Books
 Naxalbari-r Purbakshan: Kichhu Postmodern Bhabna (Kolkata: Progressive Publishers), 1998.
 Towards Naxalbari (1953-1967) (Kolkata: Progressive Publishers), 2000.
 Uttar Adhunik Rajniti O Marxbad (Kolkata: Pustak Bipani), 2005. 
 Postmodernism, Marxism, Postcolonialism (Kalna: Avenel Press), 2010.
 Uttar Adhunik Rajniti (Kolkata: Sahityalok), 2010.

Edited Books
 Discourses on Naxalite Movement (1967-2009) (Kolkata: Setu Prakashani), 2010.
 Avenel Companion to Modern Social Theorists (Kalna: Avenel) 2011.
 Colonial Modernity: Indian Perspectives (Kolkata: Setu Prakashani) 2011.
 Red on Silver: Naxalites in Cinema (Kolkata: Setu Prakashani) 2012.
 Modern Social Thinkers (Kolkata: Setu Prakashani) 2012.
 Monone Srijone Naxalbari (Kolkata: Setu Prakashani) 2012.
   Political Sociology (Kolkata: Setu Prakashani) 2016.
   Social Thinkers of Modern Times (Kolkata: Setu Prakashani) 2016.
   Naxalite Politics: Post-structuralist, Postcolonial and Subaltern Perspectives(Kolkata: Setu Prakashani) 2017.
   Theories, Society, Politics (Kalna: Avenel) 2022.
   Theories, Culture, Politics (Kalna: Avenel) 2022.
   Theories, People, Politics (Kolkata: Gangchil) 2022.
   Theories, Processes, Politics (Kolkata: Gangchil) 2022.
   Theories, Reality, Politics (Kolkata: Gangchil) 2023.
   Theories, Interaction, Politics (Kolkata: Gangchil) 2023.
   Gender and Naxalite Movement (Kolkata: Setu Prakashani) 2023.

References 

1957 births
Bengali Hindus
Bengali writers
20th-century Bengalis
21st-century Bengalis
Indian political scientists
Indian political writers
Indian writers
Indian male writers
Indian scholars
Indian historians
Indian academics
Living people
Academic staff of the University of Kalyani
Academic staff of Scottish Church College
Academic staff of the University of Calcutta
Academic staff of Presidency University, Kolkata
Scholars from Kolkata
People from West Bengal
20th-century Indian writers
20th-century Indian male writers
20th-century Indian historians
20th-century Indian scholars
21st-century Indian writers
21st-century Indian male writers
21st-century Indian scholars
21st-century Indian historians